Spino d'Adda is a comune (municipality) in the Province of Cremona in the Italian region Lombardy, located about  southeast of Milan and about  northwest of Cremona.

Spino d'Adda borders the following municipalities: Boffalora d'Adda, Dovera, Merlino, Pandino, Rivolta d'Adda, Zelo Buon Persico.

References

External links
 Official website

Cities and towns in Lombardy